Tarek Cheurfaoui (born 28 June 1986) is an Algerian footballer who plays as a defender for NC Magra in the Algerian Ligue Professionnelle 1.

References

External links

1986 births
Living people
Association football defenders
Algerian footballers
CR Belouizdad players
21st-century Algerian people